Flemming v. Nestor, 363 U.S. 603 (1960), was a United States Supreme Court case in which the Court upheld the constitutionality of Section 1104 of the 1935 Social Security Act. In this Section, Congress reserved to itself the power to amend and revise the schedule of benefits.

Background 
A 1954 amendment to the Social Security Act stripped old-age benefits from contributors who were deported under the Immigration and Nationality Act. The following year Ephram Nestor, an alien from Bulgaria who had paid into Social Security for 19 years, began drawing benefits. Nestor was subsequently deported for involvement in the Communist Party, and his benefits were terminated. He sued the Department of Health, Education, and Welfare on the basis that the amendment had deprived him of a property interest in Social Security without due process and was therefore invalid.

Opinion of the Court 
The Court ruled that there is no contractual right to receive Social Security payments. Payments due under Social Security are not “property” and are not protected by the Takings Clause of the Fifth Amendment. The interest of a beneficiary of Social Security is protected only by the Due Process Clause.

Under Due Process Clause analysis, government action is valid unless it is patently arbitrary and utterly lacking in rational justification. This provision of §202(n) is not irrational; it could have been justified by the desire to increase the purchasing power of those living in America, because those living abroad would not spend their payments domestically.

Critique
The case has been criticized on many grounds. In dissent, Justice Black argued that the Court's holding was motivated by anti-communist bias. Charles A. Reich argued that Social Security benefits should be considered to be "property" for the purposes of the Fifth Amendment. Social Security, he argued, is a compulsory substitute for private property, is heavily relied on, and is important to beneficiaries. The beneficiary's right to Social Security, he argued, should not be subject to public policy considerations (especially not something resembling a loyalty oath, as was the case in Flemming). According to this argument, allowing government benefits to be revoked in this way too extensively threatens the system of private property.

Further reading

External links
 
Case Details from the Social Security Administration

United States Supreme Court cases
United States Supreme Court cases of the Warren Court
Social Security lawsuits
Takings Clause case law
United States administrative case law
United States immigration and naturalization case law
1960 in United States case law